Robert Lively may refer to:

Robert M. Lively (1855–1929), U.S. Representative from Texas
Robert Lively (screenwriter) (died 1943), American screenwriter and songwriter